"For Free? (Interlude)" is a song by American rapper Kendrick Lamar. It is the second track on his third studio album To Pimp a Butterfly, released on March 15, 2015. It features uptempo bebop instrumentals, with Lamar rapping over them. A music video for the song was uploaded to Vevo and YouTube on July 31, 2015.

Music video
The song's accompanying music video premiered on July 31, 2015 on Lamar's Vevo account. It starts with a woman (Darlene Tibbs) voicing the introductory spoken word section while actress/model Hikeah Kareem appears as the woman in the video lip-syncing the section. She rants off a long list of complaints about her "unfortunate" partner/pimp, played by Lamar before he appears - face pressed to a screen door - and proceeds to chase her around the estate while rapping and yelling, “This dick ain’t free!” Then, Lamar appears again from behind a window with a live band and pops his head into the bathroom. In the Joe Weil & The Little Homies-directed clip, Lamar takes a number of forms terrorizing his partner. The visual metaphors aligns with those of the song's lyrics, both asserting his own self-worth to a woman and to the marginalizing temptations of "success" in America.

Charts

Credits

 Kendrick Lamar – vocals
 Robert Sput Searight – drums
 Robert Glasper – piano
 Brandon Owens – bass
 Craig Brockman – organ
 Marlon Williams – guitar
 Terrace Martin – alto saxophone, production
 Anna Wise – background vocals
 Darlene Tibbs – background vocals

References

External links

2015 songs
Kendrick Lamar songs
Songs written by Kendrick Lamar
Songs written by Terrace Martin
Jazz rap songs